Alaska Air Group is an American airline holding company based in SeaTac, Washington, United States.

The group owns two certificated airlines, Alaska Airlines, a mainline carrier, and Horizon Air, a regional carrier. Alaska Airlines in turn wholly owns an aircraft ground handling company, McGee Air Services.

History
Alaska Air Group was formed in 1985 as a holding company for Alaska Airlines, and a year later it acquired Horizon Air and Jet America Airlines. Jet America Airlines was merged into Alaska Airlines in 1987.

In 2011, Alaska Air Group replaced the AMR Corporation in the Dow Jones Transportation Average following AMR's filing for bankruptcy.

On March 29, 2016, Alaska Airlines announced that it would form a wholly owned subsidiary called McGee Air Services, a dedicated airline services company. McGee competes with other companies to provide ground handling, aircraft cleaning and wheelchair services to Alaska Airlines.

On April 4, 2016, Alaska Air Group announced plans to acquire Virgin America, pending approval from US government regulators and Virgin America shareholders; the acquisition was completed on December 14, 2016. The total price was approximately $2.6 billion. Until 2018, Alaska Air Group continued to operate Alaska Airlines and Virgin America as separate airlines and continued to honor both Alaska's Mileage Plan and Virgin America's Elevate loyalty programs. Following the acquisition of Virgin America,  the actual number of Alaska Air Group employees had increased from 15,143 at the end of 2015 to 19,112 (12,224 at Alaska Airlines, 3,616 at Horizon Air, and 3,252 at Virgin America) by the end of 2016.

On March 22, 2017, the company announced that Alaska Air Group would merge Virgin America and Alaska Airlines, with the combined airline to operate under the Alaska Airlines brand. The merger was largely completed on April 25, 2018 and the Virgin America brand was fully retired by June 2, 2019.

Corporate affairs

Business trends 
The key trends for Alaska Air Group over recent years are shown below (as at year ending December 31):

Headquarters 

The Alaska Air Group headquarters is located at 19300 International Boulevard, SeaTac, Washington, United States.

On May 3, 2018, Alaska Airlines unveiled plans to construct a 128,000-square-foot building near Sea-Tac Airport to provide office space for its growing workforce. The new building will be across the street from Alaska's Corporate Headquarters and adjacent to its Flight Training Center.  Construction was expected to be completed by early 2020.

Operations

Fleet
Alaska Air Group operates a mix of Airbus, Boeing, Bombardier, and Embraer aircraft through its subsidiaries Alaska Airlines and Horizon Air. As of October 2017, Alaska Airlines' fleet consisted of 248 jet aircraft, and Horizon Air's fleet consisted of 41 turboprop and 16 jet aircraft, with the combined fleet under Alaska Air Group's management numbering 298 aircraft.

Alaska Air Group has created a new branding identity for its Horizon Air subsidiary and other independently owned and separately directed affiliate regional airlines it chooses to contract to do regional flying business into markets too limited to be flown only on Alaska Airlines mainline equipment. Among the other airlines now sub-contracted to do additional flying for the Alaska Air Group is SkyWest Airlines, whose Embraer 175 aircraft dedicated to providing service for the Alaska Airlines are painted in a very similar manner to Horizon's. SkyWest's fleet however, is branded Alaska SkyWest to differentiate that airline's aircraft from those of Horizon Air.

Route network 
Through Alaska Airlines and Horizon Air, Alaska Air Group services the passenger and cargo markets of the Pacific Northwest with its extensive route network hub through Seattle/Tacoma and Portland International Airports, and the state of Alaska through Ted Stevens Anchorage International Airport. After the demise of Aloha Airlines and ATA Airlines in 2008, Alaska Air Group expanded heavily centering on Hawaii and other non-airline hub secondary mainland cities and airports, including San Diego International Airport and San Jose International Airport. After the acquisition of Virgin America in 2016, Alaska Air Group further expanded into California through Virgin America's hubs at San Francisco and Los Angeles International Airports, and focus city at Dallas Love Field in Texas.

References

External links

 
1985 establishments in Washington (state)
Airline holding companies of the United States
Airlines based in Alaska
Companies based in King County, Washington
Companies in the Dow Jones Transportation Average
Companies listed on the New York Stock Exchange
Holding companies established in 1985
SeaTac, Washington
American companies established in 1985
Airlines based in Washington (state)